Arja Uusitalo (born 10 July 1951 in Helsinki) is a Finnish poet and journalist.

She moved to Sweden and attended the University of Stockholm, studying social anthropology, pedagogy, the Finnish language and economic history. She went to Poppius Journalist School to work as journalist. Uusitalo published poems in Swedish and Finnish magazines and worked in Swedish Radio. In 1992, a documentary film was made about her on Finnish television. Arja won a prize for her  libretto which was composed by Oliver Kohlenberg and played in Kärsämäki in July 2000.

Selected works
 Medan nattens leoparder, 1984
 Och klappar kaoset om ryggen, 1986
 Puutarhallinen lohdutusta eksyneille, 1987
 Syrjäytetyt minät, 1988
 Pyysit miniatyyriä, 1992
 Meren syli, 1992 (photographs by Tuija Lindström)
 Turvapaikka, 2000 (opera libretto, composed by Oliver Kohlenberg)
 Come-back, 2000
 Tukholmalainen Blogikirja, 2006
 Äkillinen oivallus, 2008
 Tukholmalaisnovelleja, 2008
Vainajat nauravat kuorossa, 2010

References

1951 births
Living people
Writers from Helsinki
Finnish emigrants to Sweden
20th-century Finnish poets
Finnish journalists
Finnish women poets
20th-century women writers
Finnish women journalists